The South Banat District is one of seven administrative districts of the autonomous province of Vojvodina, Serbia. The administrative center of the district is the city of Pančevo. The district lies in the region of Banat. According to the 2011 census results, it has a population of 291,327 inhabitants.

Name
In Serbian, the district is known as Južnobanatski okrug (Јужнобанатски округ), in Croatian as Južnobanatski okrug, in Hungarian as Dél-bánsági körzet, in Slovak as Juhobanátsky okres, in Romanian as Districtul Banatul de Sud, and in Rusyn as /Јужнобанатски окрух/.

Municipalities
It encompasses the cities of Pančevo and Vršac and the following municipalities:
 Plandište
 Opovo
 Kovačica
 Alibunar
 Bela Crkva
 Kovin

Demographics

According to the last official census done in 2011, the South Banat District has 293,730 inhabitants.

Ethnic groups
Most of the municipalities in the district have an ethnic Serb majority, while the municipality of Kovačica is ethnically mixed, with a relative Slovak majority (41.8%). Ethnic composition of the South Banat district:

Culture
Pančevo is distinguished for its numerous cultural institutions: the National Library 'Veljko Vlahović', the Historic Archives, and the Institute for Protection of Culture Monuments.

The most remarkable cultural monuments in this region are the Vojlovica Monastery built in 1405, the Church of Assumption, the Church of Transfiguration built in 1811 and the National Museum built in 1833.

See also
 Administrative divisions of Serbia
 Districts of Serbia
 Former Temes and Torontál counties of Lands of the Crown of Saint Stephen

References

Note: All official material made by Government of Serbia is public by law. Information was taken from official website.

External links

 

 
Geography of Vojvodina
Banat
Districts of Vojvodina